Roosevelt Désir (born 4 April 1974) is a retired Haitian football defender.

References

1974 births
Living people
Haitian footballers
Haiti international footballers
Football Inter Club Association players
AS Capoise players
Association football defenders
Ligue Haïtienne players
2000 CONCACAF Gold Cup players
2002 CONCACAF Gold Cup players